Clark was a station on the Chicago Transit Authority's Howard Line, which is now part of the Red Line. The station was located at the corner of Clark and Roscoe Streets in the Lakeview neighborhood of Chicago, at what is now the junction between the Red and Brown lines. Clark was situated north of Belmont and south of Addison. Clark opened on June 6, 1900, and closed on August 1, 1949, along with 23 other stations as part of a CTA service revision.

References

Railway stations in the United States opened in 1900
Railway stations closed in 1949
1900 establishments in Illinois
1949 disestablishments in Illinois
Defunct Chicago "L" stations